Prince Hugo de Bourbon de Parme, formerly Hugo Klynstra, (Carlos Hugo Roderik Sybren; born 20 January 1997) is a member of the extended Dutch Royal Family as the illegitimate son of Prince Carlos, Duke of Parma. He was the first great-grandchild of Queen Juliana of the Netherlands. Born out of wedlock, he was denied titles and family rights by his father until the Dutch Council of State ruled in his favor in 2018, granting him the style and title of His Royal Highness Prince Carlos Hugo Roderik Sybren de Bourbon de Parme. Despite the ruling, he is not a member of the Dutch royal house nor a member of the House of Bourbon-Parma and is not in the line of succession to the defunct throne of Parma nor the Carlist line of succession to the throne of Spain.

Early life and family 
Carlos Hugo Roderik Sybren Klynstra was born in Nijmegen on 20 January 1997 to Prince Carlos de Bourbon de Parme, Prince of Piacenza and his friend Brigitte Klynstra. A 1999 court order pursued by his mother determined his paternity. Due to being an illegitimate son, he was not born a prince. His father told Dutch media that Hugo's birth was "his mother's wish" and an "independent decision", denying his son any family rights.

His maternal grandmother, Ingrid Pieksma-Klynstra, was the wife of Adolph Roderik Ernst Leopold, Count of Rechteren-Limpurg. Through this relation, he is a relative of Princess Anna of Ysenburg and Büdingen. Through his father, he is a grandson of Carlos Hugo, Duke of Parma and Princess Irene of the Netherlands. He is the first great-grandchild of Queen Juliana of the Netherlands and Prince Bernhard of Lippe-Biesterfeld. He is also a great-grandson of Prince Xavier of Bourbon-Parma and Madeleine de Bourbon-Busset.

Upon the death of his grandfather, Carlos Hugo, in 2010, his father became the titular Duke of Parma and Piacenza, Carlist claimant to the Spanish throne, and the Head of the House of Bourbon-Parma. That same year, his father married the Dutch journalist Annemarie Gualthérie van Weezel. According to a royal degree made by Queen Beatrix in 1996, his father is also a Dutch prince.

He is the half-brother of Princess Luisa de Bourbon de Parme, Marchioness of Castell'Arquatol; Princess Cecilia de Bourbon de Parme, Countess of Berceto; and Carlos de Bourbon de Parme, Prince of Piacenza.

Legal dispute over title 
Upon turning eighteen in 2015, Hugo went to court to have his surname changed from Klynstra to his father's surname, de Bourbon de Parme, and claimed the royal title of prince. He also sought a listing in the register of the High Council of Nobility which, by law, offers illegitimate children of nobles a right to their family's titles. His father responded with a series of court appeals, leading to a long legal battle between the two. The Duke of Parma insisted that he had a formal agreement with Hugo's mother that their relationship was "no-strings-attached" and that there would be "no family entanglement" following Hugo's conception.

In 2016 the Ministry of Justice and Security ruled in favor of Hugo's claim and granted him the use of his father's surname. Following the ruling, his father filed an appeal, taking the issue to court again. On 28 February 2018, the Dutch Council of State ruled in Hugo's favor, stating that Dutch law on nobility was clear and that the circumstances of Hugo's birth are irrelevant, granting Hugo the right to claim both his father's surname and royal title and address. As such, he became His Royal Highness Prince Carlos Hugo Roderik Sybren de Bourbon de Parme. The title of Prince de Bourbon de Parme is a Dutch title, bestowed by Queen Beatrix in 1996, and does not mean that Hugo automatically became a member of the House of Bourbon-Parma. The court ruling stated that membership to the House of Bourbon-Parma is "a private matter for the royal house itself". As such, he is not in the line of succession to the defunct Parmesan throne nor the Carlist line of succession to the Spanish throne. He is also not a member of the Dutch royal house, but is considered a member of the extended Dutch royal family.

Titles and styles 
20 January 1997 – 28 February 2018: Carlos Hugo Roderik Sybren Klynstra
28 February 2018 – present: His Royal Highness Prince Carlos Hugo Roderik Sybren de Bourbon de Parme

References 

Living people
1997 births
Dutch people of French descent
Dutch people of German descent
Dutch people of Italian descent
Dutch people of Spanish descent
Dutch princes
People from Nijmegen
Princes of Bourbon-Parma